The 1981–82 WHL season was the 16th season for the Western Hockey League.  Twelve teams completed a 72-game season.  The Portland Winter Hawks won the President's Cup.

League notes
The New Westminster Bruins relocated to Kamloops, British Columbia, to become the Kamloops Junior Oilers.
The Spokane Flyers ceased operations on December 2, 1981, after playing only 26 games.

Regular season

Final standings

1Folded mid-season

Scoring leaders
Note: GP = Games played; G = Goals; A = Assists; Pts = Points; PIM = Penalties in minutes

1982 WHL Playoffs

First round
Lethbridge defeated Billings 4 games to 1
Regina defeated Brandon 4 games to 0
Calgary defeated Saskatoon 4 games to 1

Division semi-finals
Lethbridge earned a bye
Regina defeated Calgary 3 games to 1
Portland defeated Kamloops 4 games to 0
Seattle defeated Victoria 4 games to 0

Division finals
Regina defeated Lethbridge 4 games to 3
Portland defeated Seattle 4 games to 2

WHL Championship
Portland defeated Regina 4 games to 1

All-Star game

On January 19, the West All-Stars defeated the East All-Stars 4–2 at Winnipeg, Manitoba, with a crowd of 3,500.

WHL awards

All-Star Teams

See also
1982 Memorial Cup
1982 NHL Entry Draft
1981 in sports
1982 in sports

References
whl.ca
 2005–06 WHL Guide

Western Hockey League seasons
WHL
WHL